Dorstenia petraea is a plant species in the family Moraceae which is native to eastern Cuba.

References

petraea
Plants described in 1866
Flora of Cuba
Flora without expected TNC conservation status